Bryan Carabalí (born Quinindé, Ecuador, 18 December 1997) is an Ecuadorean footballer who plays in defence for C.S. Emelec in the Ecuadorian Serie A.

Early life and education
Carabali moved to Emelec from his home city of Quininde with his family when he was nine years old as the family searched for work. His father, Dixson Carabali, permitted him to attend football training as long as he completed his school studies. Carabali continued studying at night school even after he had made his full first team debut for C.D. Cuenca in 2015 aged just 17.

Career
Carabali had made over a hundred appearances by July 17, 2019 for Cuenca when it was announced he was to go on loan to C.S. Emelec until June 2020, with the option to buy, should he perform well. In August 2019 it was announced that Emelec had bought his contract outright and it had been extended until 2024.

International career
In November 2019 he was called up to the national team by coach Jorge Célico to play friendlies against Trinidad and Tobago national football team on November 14 and against Colombia national football team on November 19. Carabali started both games, making his debut in the 3–0 win over Trinidad and Tobago at the Estadio Reales Tamarindos.

References

1997 births
Living people
Ecuador international footballers
People from Quinindé
Association football defenders
C.S. Emelec footballers
C.D. Cuenca footballers
Ecuadorian footballers